Nightlight is a 2015 American found footage supernatural thriller film written and directed by Scott Beck and Bryan Woods. The film stars Shelby Young, Chloe Bridges, Mitch Hewer, Taylor Murphy, and Carter Jenkins. It received generally negative reviews from critics.

Plot 
Five teens, Robin, Ben, Chris, Amelia, and Nia are out in the woods the day after Robin's friend, Ethan, committed suicide when Robin lied to avoid going to prom with him, causing him to kill himself in the woods, where it's rumored that those who died have never been found.

While playing the game nightlight, the teens start hearing strange noises and try to leave, but are stopped through unseen forces. Robin later learns through Nia's video camera and confession from Nia herself that the four of them invited her out to scare her during the game.

The teens are repeatedly separated and lost. Robin concludes that the soul of her deceased friend Ethan wants revenge for lying to him and believes she is the reason he killed himself.
 
One by one, Robin and the other teens are then picked off until Robin is the only left standing. She tries to reason with Ethan, as well as beg for his forgiveness. Robin is then locked inside the church and possessed. She kills Nia before walking to a cliff and jumping. As the camera pans out from Robin's body the other teens are seen as well. Ethan's flashlight can also finally be seen. There is a short scene with Ethan's suicide note though no real reason is given.

Cast 
 Shelby Young as Robin
 Chloe Bridges as Nia
 Carter Jenkins as Chris
 Mitch Hewer as Ben
 Taylor Murphy as Amelia
 Kyle Fain as Ethan

Production
Production on the film began  on May 15, 2012 in Utah.

Release
In July 2014 it was announced that Lionsgate had acquired distribution rights to the film and planned a 2015 limited release and video on demand run for the film, and that Lionsgate was partnering with The Film Arcade on the theatrical release. The film was released in the United States in a limited release and through video on demand beginning on March 27, 2015.

Reception
The film was met with negative reviews, on Rotten Tomatoes it holds a rating of 14% based on 7 reviews with an average rating of 3.6/10.

Home media
The film was released  on DVD courtesy of Lionsgate Home Entertainment on May 26, 2015 in the United States.

References

External links 
 
 

2015 films
2015 horror films
2015 horror thriller films
2015 independent films
2010s supernatural films
2010s teen horror films
American horror thriller films
American independent films
American supernatural horror films
American supernatural thriller films
American teen horror films
Films directed by Scott Beck and Bryan Woods
Films set in forests
Films shot in Salt Lake City
Found footage films
Lionsgate films
2010s English-language films
2010s American films